CP-944629, also known as 5-(3-tert-butyl-[1,2,4]triazolo[4,3-a]pyridin-6-yl)-4-(2,4,5-trifluorophenyl)-1,3-oxazole (IUPAC name), is a small molecule that is predicted to block DNA transcription by inhibiting DNA topoisomerase.

CP-944629 is thought to have anti-tumor activities. CP-944629 is assumed to be a MAPK14 (mitogen-activated protein kinase 14 (human)) inhibitor and a p38alpha inhibitor.

References 

Topoisomerase inhibitors
Triazolopyridines
Oxazoles
Fluoroarenes
Tert-butyl compounds